The Shr-Hwa Financial Center, also known as United World Chinese Bank, is a 30-story,  skyscraper office building completed in 1996 in Sinsing District, Kaohsiung, Taiwan. The top floor of the building is the Mountain Group Museum, which displays arts and other collections by the Mountain Group, which also owns the Cathay Pacific Central Plaza in Kaohsiung. In November 2020, the corporate headquarters of the ecKare group owned by Eastern Media International was established in the building. As of February 2021, it is the 26th tallest building in Kaohsiung.

See also 
 List of tallest buildings in Taiwan
 List of tallest buildings in Kaohsiung

References

1996 establishments in Taiwan
Skyscraper office buildings in Kaohsiung
Office buildings completed in 1996